Suez Shipyard has a human resources and labor power of over 1700 workers and engineers. The shipyard works on ship repair, ship building, as well as manufacturing dredging equipment, pipe laying and Bollard pull testing. It is strategically located on the southern entrance of the Suez Canal, in the Northern tip of Gulf of Suez. Its unique location gives the Suez Shipyard great importance in ship repair market and it offers a wide range of services to international customers. Suez shipyard is one of 7 companies affiliated to Suez Canal authority, this gives Suez shipyard a great power and ability to carry out any process according to international standards by aid and cooperation with the Suez canal authority and other sisters company of Suez shipyard which having different various activities.

History
Suez shipyard has been established by the Khedive Said in 1854, who began to build the dry dock or graven dock when an agreement has been signed between the governor of Egypt Prince Said and the French company to construct a graven dock for ship repair and shipbuilding.
The Shipyard was created in October 1866 to serve the ships of the Egyptian fleet and reconstruction and reform, where it was the nearest dock to Bombay, India and served multiple ships in the Royal British Navy, and was known as the Khedivial shipyard.

References

Shipyards of Egypt
Shipbuilding companies of Egypt
Transport infrastructure in Egypt
Transport in the Arab League
Defence companies of Egypt
Manufacturing companies of Egypt
Transport companies of Egypt